Szklarka may refer to the following places in Poland:
Szklarka, Lower Silesian Voivodeship (south-west Poland)
Szklarka, Lubusz Voivodeship (west Poland)